Bombers B-52 (released in the UK as No Sleep till Dawn) is a 1957 American drama film produced by Richard Whorf and directed by Gordon Douglas. The film stars Natalie Wood and Karl Malden, and co-stars Marsha Hunt and Efrem Zimbalist Jr. It was adapted from a Sam Rolfe story by screenwriter Irving Wallace. Leonard Rosenman composed the score.

The film's storyline is focused on the introduction of the Boeing B-52 Stratofortress bomber by the U.S. Strategic Air Command (SAC) in the 1950s. A respected and highly experienced master sergeant must choose between continuing his career in the Air Force and accepting a job in the private sector that would pay him three times his military salary.

Plot
The Strategic Air Command is about to introduce the B-52 Stratofortress bomber as its primary manned strategic weapon. Stationed at Castle Air Force Base, California, with the 329th Bomb Squadron, 20-year United States Air Force (USAF) veteran MSgt. Chuck Brennan dislikes his commanding officer, the "hotshot" Lt. Col. Jim Herlihy. Brennan has not trusted Herlihy since an incident in the Korean War. This career-long problem interferes with flight operations and aircraft support. When Herlihy starts dating Brennan's daughter Lois, tensions grow. Brennan demands his daughter break off the relationship.

Brennan, Herlihy, and others try to solve all the technical problems that plague the introduction of the B-52. On one top-secret test flight to Africa, after being refueled in mid-air, a control panel short-circuits, causing a fire. Herlihy orders everyone to bail out and ejects Brennan when he refuses to leave the bomber. After safely landing the burning aircraft at Castle AFB, Herlihy sends out search parties, who manage to recover all of the crew except for Brennan. Following a hunch, Herlihy eventually finds his chief aircraft mechanic, who is severely injured, and airlifts him by helicopter from remote back country to the base hospital.

While recovering, Brennan realizes that he was wrong about Herlihy, who risked his life to bring him home. He accepts that his daughter and his commanding officer should now reunite. Eventually, Brennan also has to choose between a high-paying civilian job and his US Air Force career. When told that his discharge papers are ready to sign, he decides to continue the career he loves in the USAF.

Cast
 Natalie Wood as Lois Brennan 
 Karl Malden as MSgt. Chuck V. Brennan 
 Marsha Hunt as Edith Brennan 
 Efrem Zimbalist Jr. as Lt. Col. Jim Herlihy 
 Don Kelly as MSgt. Darren McKine 
 Nelson Leigh as Brig. Gen. Wayne Acton
 Robert Nichols as Wilbur "Brooklyn" Stuart 
 Ray Montgomery as Barnes 
 Robert Hover as Simpson (as Bob Hover)
 Juanita Moore as Clarissa

Production

Bombers B-52 was filmed with the full cooperation of the United States Air Force at Castle and March Air Force Bases in California, where examples of Boeing B-47 Stratojet bombers, North American F-86 Sabre fighters, and B-52s were based. During production, Natalie Wood was named "Sweetheart of Castle Air Force Base".

The first choice for the starring role was Tab Hunter, who subsequently turned it down because he was tired of playing military roles. Writer Irving Wallace wrote a "racy" screenplay; one of the working titles was No Sleep till Dawn (which was used as the title for the film's UK release). The screenplay was later the subject of a 1980s exposé of sexual innuendo by film historian Hal Erickson.

Reception
Reviews of Bombers B-52 mainly focused on the aerial scenes, which during the Cold War era projected a near-propaganda effort, using many period aircraft to depict the era faithfully. The review in The New York Times was mildly laudatory, describing it as a "frank tribute to Air Force nuclear power, laced together with a familiar service feud ... Irving Wallace's dialogue is excellent. Furthermore, his unpretentious scenario is credible and persuasive in training sequences and especially in the hearth scenes". The performances of the leads was also considered "natural". Overall, The New York Times critic thought "'Bombers B-52' is not [terrific], but it could have been much, much worse". Variety gushed that it was "magnificently mounted, with breathtaking scenes of the new B-52s", while Time magazine more aptly characterized Bombers B-52 as a "$1,400,000 want ad for Air Force technicians". In other reviews, the dichotomy of 19-year-old Natalie Wood being courted by 40-year-old Efrem Zimbalist Jr. was noted, as well as the attempt to portray a contemporary, if tepid, love story.

Comic book adaptation
 Dell Four Color #831 (September 1957)

See also
 List of American films of 1957

References

Notes

Bibliography

 Hunter, Tab and Eddie Muller. Tab Hunter Confidential: The Making of a Movie Star. New York: Algonquin Books, 2005. .  
 Leverence, John. Irving Wallace: A Writer's Profile. Bowling Green, Ohio: Popular Press 1, 1974. .
 Maltin, Leonard. Leonard Maltin's Movie Guide 2009. New York: New American Library, 2009 (originally published as TV Movies, then Leonard Maltin’s Movie & Video Guide), First edition 1969, published annually since 1988. .

External links
 
 
 
 
 Bombers B-52 movie trailer on YouTube.com

1957 films
1957 romantic drama films
CinemaScope films
American romantic drama films
American aviation films
Cold War aviation films
Films scored by Leonard Rosenman
Films directed by Gordon Douglas
Films set in California
Films shot in California
Warner Bros. films
Films about the United States Air Force
Films adapted into comics
1950s English-language films
1950s American films